"Who's in the Strawberry Patch With Sally" is a song written by Irwin Levine and L. Russell Brown. Recorded by Tony Orlando and Dawn, the 1974 single release was an international hit, peaking at No. 3 on the Billboard Adult Contemporary chart. It also hit No. 1 in Canada, No. 6 in New Zealand, and No. 36 in the United Kingdom.

References

Songs about plants
1974 singles
Bell Records singles
Tony Orlando songs
1973 songs
Songs written by L. Russell Brown
Songs written by Irwin Levine